The New Union Treaty was a draft treaty that would have replaced the 1922 Treaty on the Creation of the USSR to salvage and reform the Soviet Union. A ceremony of the Russian SFSR signing the treaty was scheduled for 20 August 1991, but was prevented by the August Coup a day earlier. The preparation of this treaty was known as the Novo-Ogarevo process (новоогаревский процесс), named after Novo-Ogaryovo, a governmental estate where the work on the document was carried out and where Soviet President and CPSU General Secretary Mikhail Gorbachev talked with leaders of Union republics.

History
A less centralized federal system was proposed by Gorbachev during the Communist Party Congress of July 1990. A draft of the New Union Treaty was submitted to the Supreme Soviet of the Soviet Union on 23 November 1990. A drafting committee started work on the text on 1 January 1991. Six of the fifteen Soviet republics, however, did not participate in the drafting of the treaty: Armenia, Georgia, Moldova, Estonia, Latvia and Lithuania. The proposal was approved by the Soviet of the Union on 6 March and sent to the Supreme Soviets of each republic for approval. Agreement could not be reached on the distribution of power between the Union and the Republics and the proposal was not approved. As an additional restrictive element, some autonomous republics expressed the desire to raise their status and to be a party to the new Soviet treaty.

Gorbachev tried to gain popular support for the proposal. On 17 March 1991, a popular referendum was held in the nine republics (Russia, Byelorussia, Ukraine, Azerbaijan, Kazakhstan, Kirghizia, Tajikistan, Turkmenia, and Uzbekistan) which participated in the drafting of the treaty. In the referendum 76% of voters supported maintaining the federal system of the Soviet Union, including a majority in all of the nine republics. Opposition was greatest in large cities like Leningrad and Moscow. The referendum was mostly boycotted in the other six republics as they were already moving towards independence.

An agreement between the Soviet central government and the nine republics, known as the 9 + 1 agreement, was finally signed in Novo-Ogaryovo on 23 April. The New Union Treaty would have converted the Soviet Union into a confederation of independent republics with a common president, foreign policy, and military.

By August, eight of the nine republics, except Ukraine, approved the draft of the new Treaty with some conditions. Ukraine did not agree on the terms of the Treaty. In the republican referendum on 17 March, the majority of residents of Ukraine supported joining the Union only if Ukraine declared itself a sovereign state.

The treaty stated that jurisdiction over most industries and resources, and control over taxation and public expenditures would be turned to those republics that were signing it, and their sovereignty would be recognized, and those which wouldn't sign would be allowed to go their own way. The central government would retain control of the country's armed forces and security services, but with a reduced size and subjected to oversight by the republican legislatures, along with issuing its currency, the rouble, and control of its gold and diamond resources, although the republics would have the right to share them. The republics and the central government would jointly determine military and foreign policy and work out policies on the economy, fuel, and energy resources. The Congress of People's Deputies would be disbanded. The number of government ministries would be reduced, some ministries having their responsibilities transferred to the republics, some having to reduce staff or abolished, or turned into small coordinating bodies which would support republican ministries. The republics would also be given ownership of almost all their natural resources, including mineral deposits on their territories, along with the right to establish direct diplomatic and trade relations with foreign states. A new constitutional court would have also been established to resolve questions between republics and the center. Lastly, republican law would take precedence over All-Union law.

Though the treaty was intended to save the union, hardliners feared that it would encourage some of the smaller republics to follow the lead of Lithuania and press for full independence. On 18 August, the hardliners took control of the government after confining Gorbachev in his Crimean dacha in order to stop him from returning to Moscow to sign the treaty. The August Coup collapsed in the face of overwhelming opposition not only from the smaller republics but from larger ones, especially Russia.

Because the treaty was ultimately not signed, even in the aftermath of Ukrainian independence in December, the leaders of the republics organized the Commonwealth of Independent States, an alliance of 12 newly independent states. The Baltic states never joined the CIS. Ukraine, which never formally became a member, ended its participation in CIS statutory bodies in 2018, due to prolonged tensions with Russia. Georgia was not a member until 1993 and withdrew in 2008 following the Russo-Georgian War.

Names of the proposed state
On the first draft of the treaty released in July 1991, the proclaimed name for the new polity was the Union of Soviet Sovereign Republics. This name was proposed in order to conserve the Russian "СССР" acronym, meaning "USSR" and "Soviet Union" in English and other languages.

By September 1991, overall support for preserving the Soviet state changed to reform the Soviet Union into a confederation of sovereign states. The final draft renamed the proposed state the Union of Sovereign States. The overall chances of a continuation of the Soviet system in any form continued to drop and was soon abandoned. Following the August coup, the new union treaty was further reformed into the Commonwealth of Independent States.

Proposed member republics, autonomous republics (ASSR) and autonomous oblasts (AO)

Union republics (SSR)
Russia (Russian SFSR)
Byelorussia (Byelorussian SSR)
Ukraine (Ukrainian SSR)
Azerbaijan (Azerbaijan SSR)
Kazakhstan (Kazakh SSR)
Kirghizia (Kirghiz SSR)
Tajikistan (Tajik SSR)
Turkmenia (Turkmen SSR)
Uzbekistan (Uzbek SSR)

Former autonomous republics (ASSR) and autonomous oblasts (AO)
Abkhazia (former Abkhaz ASSR)
South Ossetia (former South Ossetian AO)
Gagauzia (Gagauz Republic)
Transnistria (Pridnestrovian SSR)

Republics (SSR), autonomous republics (ASSR) and autonomous oblasts (AO) that rejected the treaty

Former Union republics (SSR)
Armenia (former Armenian SSR)
Georgia (former Georgian SSR)
Moldova (former Moldavian SSR)
Estonia (former Estonian SSR)
Latvia (former Latvian SSR)
Lithuania (former Lithuanian SSR)

Former autonomous republics (ASSR) and autonomous oblasts (AO)
Nagorno-Karabakh (former Nagorno-Karabakh AO)

See also

History of the Soviet Union (1982–1991)
Perestroika
Uskoreniye
Glasnost
New political thinking
Demokratizatsiya (Soviet Union)
500 Days Program
Predictions of the collapse of the Soviet Union
Revolutions of 1989

Notes

References 

1990s in politics
1990s in the Soviet Union
Dissolution of the Soviet Union
History of Russia
Mikhail Gorbachev
Perestroika
Reform in the Soviet Union
Soviet internal politics
Proposed countries